This is a list of television shows,  movies and video games that were either filmed, or set, in the U.S. state of West Virginia

Movies 
American Ultra (2015)
A Beautiful Mind (2001)
A Killing Affair (1986)
Act of Vengeance (1986)
The Antler Boy (1994)
Big Business (1988)
 Blood Creek (2009)
Bubble (2005)
Captured Alive (1997)
Chillers (1986)
Correct Change (2001)
The Dancing Outlaw (1991)
Dear Wendy (2005)
The Deer Hunter (1978)
The Descent (2005)
Fools' Parade (1971)
The Glass Castle (2017)
Gods and Generals (2003)
The Hatfields and McCoys (1975)
Little Accidents (2014)
Live Free or Die Hard (2007)
Logan Lucky (2017)
Matewan (1986)
The Millerson Case (1947)
The Mosque in Morgantown (2009)
Mothman (2000)
The Mothman Prophecies (2002)
My Fellow Americans (1996)
The Night of the Hunter (1955)
No Drums, No Bugles (1972)
October Sky (1999)
Super 8 (2011)
Paradise Park (1990)
Pardes (1997)
Patch Adams (1998)
Primal Fear (1996)
Pudd'n'head Wilson (1984)
The Rain People (1969)
Road Trip (2000)
Reckless (1983)
Seven to Midnight (2001)
Shenandoah (1965)
The Silence of the Lambs (1991)
Silent Hill (2006)
Strangest Dreams: Invasion of the Space Preachers (1989)
Sweet Dreams (1985)
Teenage Strangler (1968)
Timber Falls (2007)
Tucker & Dale vs Evil  (2010)
Two Tickets to Paradise (2006)
We Are Marshall (2006)
Whatever (1998)
When the Line Goes Through (1973)
Whispers from Space (1995)
Win a Date with Tad Hamilton! (2004)
Wrong Turn (2003)
Wrong Turn 2: Dead End (2007)
Wrong Turn 3: Left for Dead (2009)
Wrong Turn 4: Bloody Beginnings (2011)
Wrong Turn 5: Bloodlines (2012)
Wrong Turn 6: Last Resort (2014)
Wrong Turn (2021)
The X-Files: I Want to Believe (2008)

Television 
Hoarders (2019 tv series) "SHERRY"
The Americans (1961) Television series on the Civil War involving the Canfield family of Harper's Ferry, West Virginia.
The Andy Griffith Show (As a prank, Ottis tells Barney how to find a whiskey still by going from NC through" WV and back to NC. Aunt Bee frequently talks about her family in Morgantown, WV —the real-life hometown of Don Knotts, who played Barney —and growing up in WV).
Barnwood Builders (2013-) Mark Bowe and his team carefully dismantle, salvage, and reconstruct buildings originally crafted by skilled manual woodworkers in the 19th and early 20th centuries
Buckwild (2013) – MTV reality series about a group of young adults in rural Kanawha County.
Clarice (2021)
Coal (2011)
Ghost Adventures (Moundsville State Prison)
Ghost Hunters (Moundsville State Prison)
Hawkins (1973-1974)
It's a Man's World (1962-1963) - (Although set in the fictional town modeled on Marietta, Ohio, includes excursion across the river to West Virginia, most prominently in the episodes "The Beavers and the Otters" and "The Drive Over to Exeter". Also mentions rival West Virginia colleges and The Wheeling Intelligencer newspaper.)
The Men Who Built America (2012) History Channel
Mountain Monsters (2013-)
My Brother, My Brother and Me (2017–)
16 and Pregnant (2010)
Teen Mom 2 (2011–)
Viva La Bam - Ryan Dunn was riding a small motorcycle trying to catch up with Bam.
The World Wars (2014) History Channel
The X-Files (1993-2002)

Video games 
Fallout 76 (2018) - this game in the popular post-apocalyptic video game series Fallout is set in an alternate future West Virginia, devastated by nuclear war

West Virginia culture
Television shows and movies in West Virginia, List of